Caladenia magniclavata, commonly known as big clubbed spider orchid is a species of orchid endemic to the south-west of Western Australia. It has a single, hairy leaf, and up to three pale yellow-green and red flowers with downswept, prominently clubbed sepals and petals.

Description 
Flowering occurs from September to early November.

Taxonomy and naming 
Caladenia magniclavata was first described in 1947 by William Nicholls and the description was published in The Victorian Naturalist. The specific epithet (magniclavata) is derived from the Latin words magnus meaning "large" or "great" and clava meaning "club", referring to the large clubs on the sepals and petals.

Distribution and habitat 
The big clubbed spider orchid is found in the area between Perth and Albany in the Avon Wheatbelt, Jarrah Forest and Warren biogeographic regions where it grows in dense jarrah and karri forest.

Conservation
Caladenia magniclavata is classified as "not threatened" by the Western Australian Government Department of Parks and Wildlife.

References

magniclavata
Orchids of Western Australia
Endemic orchids of Australia
Plants described in 1947
Endemic flora of Western Australia